The Kleiber House is a historic house at 637 Skyline Drive in North Little Rock, Arkansas.  It is a two-story frame house, finished in a buff brick veneer.  Its most prominent exterior feature is a two-story porch, with wrought iron railings, and a brick extension of the side wall that curves to support the main roof as it overhangs the porch.  The house was built in 1929 on speculation as part of Justin Mathews' Edgement development.  Its first owner, Victor Kleiber, lost it to foreclosure during the Great Depression.

The house was listed on the National Register of Historic Places in 1992 for its unusual architecture, which is not seen elsewhere in the Edgemont area.

See also
National Register of Historic Places listings in Pulaski County, Arkansas

References

Houses on the National Register of Historic Places in Arkansas
Houses completed in 1929
Houses in Little Rock, Arkansas
National Register of Historic Places in Little Rock, Arkansas